Zavrh pri Črnivcu is a dispersed settlement near the Črnivec Pass in the Municipality of Kamnik in the Upper Carniola region of Slovenia.

Name
The name of the settlement was changed from Zavrh to Zavrh pri Črnivcu in 1953.

References

External links

Zavrh pri Črnivcu on Geopedia

Populated places in the Municipality of Kamnik